Tigress of King River ( or Sab Suea Thi Lam Nam Kasat) is a 2002 Thai adventure thriller film directed and written by Bhandit Rittakol.

Summary
The story takes place the in 19th year of the King Rama V's reign. When the British captain Peter Bain is busted for trying to sell defective firearms to influential Chinese non-timber forest product trader named Yang. Forced to hunt wild game with these firearms along with Yang's men, Bain links up with ex-monk Wan and Karen-American female guide and hunter Julia, who he meets on the way to the jungle. The group sets off to hunt a long-tusked elephant, said to be protected by a demon tigress that can transform itself into a woman. The tigress is supposedly possessed by the revengeful spirit of Nian, a young woman who was tortured and killed in the King River Battle near the Three Pagoda Pass almost a century earlier. 

As Wan learns more about the tigress myth, he tries to release Nian's spirit, but Yang's men want to destroy Nian and get the elephant. With greed, resentment, and karma from past lives encircling the group, violence is surely around the corner.

Cast
Panu Suwanno as Wan
Prangthong Changdham as Nian
Jo Scott Shepherd as Peter Bain
Sunisa Brown as Julia
Sompong Chullasapya as Yang

Production and reception
Tigress of King River is the final work of Bhandit Rittakol a veteran filmmaker who made many hits in the 1980s and 1990s. This is Rittakol's first adventure thriller and special effects film. Of the works that are mostly comedic genre. Due to the change in film production, the response was not good. It is considered a lesser-known work of Rittakol.

Although the story takes place at the King River, but it was filmed on the Songalia River.

Tigers are  appeared in the film are trained by Sriracha Tiger Zoo under The Thai Wild Animal Reservation and Protection Act, B.E. 2535 (1992).

The film was criticized "as a state-race blur and the complexity of religion".

Nominations
The film has been nominated for four awards at the 11th Bangkok Critics Assembly Awards consist of Best Director (Bhandit Rittakol), Best Actor (Panu Suwanno), Best Screenplay (Bhandit Rittakol) and Best Art Direction (Wanchai Leng-Ew). It is also nominated for the 12th Suphannahong National Film Awards for Best Actor (Panu Suwanno), but missed all.

Trivia
 The King River is a real. Locally known as "Lam Nam Kaset" (ลำน้ำกษัตริย์), translated as "King River". There is another river that is a pair, namely "Lam Nam Suriya" (ลำน้ำสุริยะ, "Solar River"). Both of them do not appear on any map at all. Both watercourses flow upstream to confluence the Salween River in Myanmar side. Currently, they originated in Thung Yai Naresuan Wildlife Sanctuary, Kanchanaburi Province. 

 The King River Battle in the story is part of the Nine Armies War (1785–86) that took place during the King Rama I's reign in the early Rattanakosin period. Regarded as the last great war between Siam (Thailand) and Burma (Myanmar).

 The demon tigress that appears in the film. In Thai, it is called "Suea Saming" (เสือสมิง), similar to a werecat or a skin-walker in Western beliefs. Suea Saming is the belief of a race of forest dwelling people, such as Karen. The person who could turn into a tiger (or tigress) was because of the power of black magic. Suea Saming believed to be the spirit of the jungle and is the mineral lick protector. It often lures its preys (most of them are hunters) by transforming into their wife or lover, by tricking them down from the raised platform hung on a tree waiting for game at night to kill. The story of Suea Saming is mentioned in Thai history. It was written in the memoir of King Rama V's visit to the people when he traveled to the forest of Chanthaburi in 1876.

Sab Suae Thi Lam Nam Kasat, the film Thai title, literally translated as "the stench of tiger at King River" or "the curse of tiger at King River" even "Siam weed at King River" in other senses.

See also
Thai ghosts

References

External links
 
Tigress of the King River

2000s adventure thriller films
2002 films
2000s adventure films
Thai-language films
Films set in 1886
Films set in Thailand
Films set in Myanmar
Films shot in Thailand
Films about tigers
Films about hunters
Films about elephants
Thai thriller films
Films directed by Bhandit Rittakol
Sahamongkol Film International films